Lobnya is a terminus railway station for Line D1 of the Moscow Central Diameters in Moscow Oblast and intermediate for other trains towards Dmitrov and other cities. It was opened in 1901 and will be rebuilt in 2021 - 2024.

Gallery

References

Railway stations in Moscow Oblast
Railway stations of Moscow Railway
Railway stations in the Russian Empire opened in 1901
Line D1 (Moscow Central Diameters) stations